Klebsormidiales is an order of charophyte algae. It is the only order in the class Klebsormidiophyceae, sister of the Phragmoplastophyta. , AlgaeBase accepted two families in the order:
Elakatotrichaceae Hindák
Klebsormidiaceae K.D.Stewart & K.R.Mattox

References

Green algae orders
Charophyta